Tuczno  (earlier Tietz) is a town and former pre-diocesan Catholic see in Wałcz County, West Pomeranian Voivodeship in northwestern Poland, with 2,014 inhabitants (2004).

It is the home of the restored Tuczno Castle, which is a popular place for conferences.

There is a Michael Jackson Street in Tuczno, the first of its kind in Poland.

History 

The first written evidence of Tuczno dates from year 1306. In 1338, Tuczno Castle was erected.

Before 1772 Tuczno was part of the Kingdom of Poland as part of Greater Poland. In 1772 it was annexed by Prussia, in 1871 became part of Germany, and became again part of Poland in 1945.

Landmarks 
 Tuczno Castle
 Church of the Assumption of the Blessed Virgin Mary

Ecclesiastical History 
In 1923.05.01 was established the permanent Apostolic Administration of Tütz (German; Tuczno in Polish) on canonical territories split off from the Metropolitan Archdiocese of Gniezno and Diocese of Chełmno, but when the Apostolic Administration (exempt) was promoted on 1930.08.13, it was also renamed after its new see, as Territorial Prelature of Schneidemühl (German; in 1945 renamed in Polish Piła).

See also 
 List of Catholic dioceses in Germany
 List of Catholic dioceses in Poland
 Tuczno, Lubusz Voivodeship

References 

Cities and towns in West Pomeranian Voivodeship
Wałcz County

it:Tuczno